Alfred Bula (6 March 1908 – 17 December 1995) was a Swiss racing cyclist. He rode in the 1932 Tour de France.

References

1908 births
1995 deaths
Swiss male cyclists
Place of birth missing
Tour de Suisse stage winners